Johnny Deley (born 20 December 1950) is a former Belgian professional darts player who has played members from the 1980s and 1990s.

Career

From Torhout, Deley played in the 1988 World Professional Darts Championship, losing in the first round 3–1 in sets to Australia's Russell Stewart. He then played in the 1988 Winmau World Masters, losing to Mike Gregory in the first round.

Deley was a semi-finalist in the 1987 Belgium Open and also reached the last 16 of the 1988 Dutch Open where he lost to Raymond van Barneveld and also reached the quarter-finalist of the 1996 French Open.

Deley quit of the PDC in October 1996.

World Championship performances

BDO
 1988: 1st Round (lost to Russell Stewart 1–3) (sets)

External links
Profile and stats on Darts Database

Belgian darts players
Living people
British Darts Organisation players
1950 births
People from Torhout
Sportspeople from West Flanders